Acceleration at Slovakia Ring was the fifth weekend of Acceleration 2014, a multi-day festival combining top class car and bike racing with live music and other entertainment. The festival was organised by the International Sport Racing Association (ISRA), based in the Netherlands, to be held six times in 2014, starting 25–27 April in Portimao, Portugal and ending 17–19 October in Assen, Netherlands. The various racing competitions were
Formula Acceleration 1 (FA1), the MW-V6 Pickup Series, the Legend SuperCup (LSC), the European Stock 1000 Series (ACC 1000) and the European Stock 600 Series (ACC 600). However, the FA1 did not compete during this round of the championship.

Every driver entering Acceleration 2014 was eligible for points in the drivers' championship as well as the nations' championship. As for music and entertainment, David Hasselhoff was the host of "Celebrate the 80's and the 90's with The Hoff", a dance party featuring 2 Unlimited, Haddaway, and others. Saturday evenings were filled with performances of international DJs.

MW-V6 Pickup Series results

Free practices

Qualifying sessions

Qualifying 1:
 #30, #41, #47 – fastest lap time disallowed for not respecting track limits

Race 1

Race 2

Race 3

Drivers' championship standings after 15 out of 18 races

Nations' championship standings after 15 out of 18 races

Legend SuperCup results

Free practices

Race 1

 #30 – 25 second time penalty for not complying with drive-through penalty

Race 2

Race 3

Race 4

Drivers' championship standings after 20 out of 24 races

Nations' championship standings after 20 out of 24 races

European Stock Series results

Free practices

Qualifying sessions

Race

Final Class 1000 riders' championship standings

Final Class 600 riders' championship standings

References

Main source
raceresults.nu

Other references

Slovakia Ring
Acceleration